Alice Wong (born March 27, 1974) is a disability rights activist based in San Francisco, California.

Early life
Alice Wong was born in the suburbs of Indianapolis, Indiana to parents who had immigrated to the US from Hong Kong. She was born with spinal muscular atrophy, a neuromuscular disorder. Wong stopped walking at the age of seven or eight.

Wong attended Indiana University–Purdue University Indianapolis, where she earned a BA in English and sociology in 1997. She received a masters degree from the University of California, San Francisco in medical sociology in 2004.

Career
Wong is the founder and Project Coordinator of the Disability Visibility Project (DVP), a project collecting oral histories of people with disabilities in the US that is run in coordination with StoryCorps. The Disability Visibility Project was created before the 25th anniversary of the Americans with Disabilities Act of 1990. As of 2018, the project had collected approximately 140 oral histories.

Wong works the Disabled Writers project, which is funded by a grant from Wong and The Disability Project. Disabled Writers is a resource to help editors connect with disabled writers and journalists. #CripLit, is a series of Twitter chats for disabled writers with novelist Nicola Griffith, and #CripTheVote, a nonpartisan online movement encouraging the political participation of disabled people. She discusses her activism in Narrabase.

Wong serves as an advisory board member for Asians and Pacific Islanders with Disabilities of California (APIDC). She was a presidential appointee to the National Council on Disability, an independent federal agency which advises the president, Congress, and other federal agencies on disability policies, programs, and practices, from 2013 to 2015.

In 2015, Wong attended the reception at the White House for the 25th anniversary of the Americans With Disabilities Act via telepresence robot. She was the first person to visit the White House and the President by robot presence.

Awards
For her leadership on behalf of the disability community, Wong received the Mayor’s Disability Council Beacon Award in 2010, the first-ever Chancellor’s Disability Service Award in 2010, and the 2007 Martin Luther King, Jr. Award at her alma mater of UCSF. In 2016, Wong received the 2016 American Association of People with Disabilities Paul G. Hearne Leadership Award, an award for emerging leaders with disabilities who exemplify leadership, advocacy, and dedication to the broader cross-disability community. Wong was selected as a Ford Foundation Disability Futures Fellow in 2020. The same year Wong was on the list of the BBC's 100 Women announced on 23 November 2020. In 2021 Alice Wong won "Best Supporting Actor" at the New Jersey Web Fest for her performance in Someone Dies In This Elevator.

Bibliography 
 2018: Resistance and Hope: Essays by Disabled People. Ed.
 2020: Disability Visibility: First-Person Stories from the Twenty-First Century. Knopf Doubleday Publishing Group. Ed.
 2021: Disability Visibility (Adapted for Young Adults): 17 First-Person Stories for Today. Delacorte Press.
 2022: Year of The Tiger: An Activist's Life. Vintage.

References

External links
"Finding Dory, Disability Culture, and Collective Access". Disability Visibility Project. Retrieved 9 March 2019.
Disability Visibility podcast

1974 births
American disability rights activists
Living people
American bloggers
Activists from San Francisco
Place of birth missing (living people)
American women bloggers
Activists from Indiana
People with spinal muscular atrophy
21st-century American women
Indiana University–Purdue University Indianapolis alumni
University of California, San Francisco alumni
BBC 100 Women
People from Indianapolis
American people of Hong Kong descent